Brian Kennedy is a male former international table tennis player from England.

He won a gold medal at the 1953 World Table Tennis Championships in the men's team event with Richard Bergmann, Adrian Haydon, Johnny Leach and Aubrey Simons for England.

Two years later he won a bronze medal at the 1955 World Table Tennis Championships in the men's team event.

He also won an English Open title.

See also
 List of table tennis players
 List of World Table Tennis Championships medalists
 List of England players at the World Team Table Tennis Championships

References

English male table tennis players
World Table Tennis Championships medalists